The Questair Venture is a homebuilt aircraft manufactured by Questair at John Bell Williams Airport in Bolton, Mississippi, United States. The aircraft first flew on 1 July 1987.

Development
Questair, Inc. was founded by Ed MacDonough and Jim Griswold in the mid 1980s. The Venture was designed by Griswold, a former chief engineer with Piper Aircraft, and used technology from the Piper Malibu, which Griswold led the design for as well. The layout of the design was intended to combine a large two-seat side-by-side cabin with rear baggage space in the smallest possible airframe, having a highly streamlined design.

The aircraft is of all-metal construction using pre-formed multi-curvature panels and is supplied as a kit to homebuilders.  The Venture has a complex tricycle retractable undercarriage, but the Spirit version has a fixed spatted wheel fairings on the main landing gear, the nose landing gear remaining retractable.  The engine is a Continental IO-550-G, designed specifically for the aircraft.

Operational history
The first Venture made its maiden flight on 1 July 1987, and in 1991 it was followed by the Questair Spirit which had an optional third rear seat as well as fixed tricycle undercarriage.  Both types have been built from kits by amateur constructors and over 30 had been completed by 2001. In 1991, a Questair Venture set a time-to-climb record for its class of two minutes, thirty-one seconds to reach 3000 meters. The record stood until broken in 1999 by the custom-built Bohannon B-1.

In June 1989 the Venture set three FAI speed records for piston aircraft weighing less than 1000 kg:
 331 miles/hour average for four 3-km runs at low altitude (beat by the Nemesis NXT in 2008)
 305 mph for a 100-km circuit
 284 mph for a 1000-km circuit

The 100-km and 1000-km records still stand in 2022.

Aircraft on display
EAA AirVenture Museum, Oshkosh, Wisconsin, second prototype Venture

Specifications (Venture)

References

Notes

Bibliography

External links
 

1980s United States civil utility aircraft
Low-wing aircraft
Single-engined tractor aircraft
Aircraft first flown in 1987